William Martin Smyth (born 15 June 1931) is a Northern Irish unionist politician, who served as the  Ulster Unionist Party (UUP) Member of Parliament (MP) for Belfast South from 1982 to 2005. He was a vice-president of the Conservative Monday Club.

He is also an ordained minister of the Presbyterian Church in Ireland and was minister of Raffrey, County Down from 1957 to 1963 and of Alexandra Church, Belfast 1963–1982.

Early life
Smyth was brought up in the Donegall Road area of Belfast and attended Methodist College Belfast and Trinity College Dublin.

Beginning of political career 

Smyth became Grand Master of the Orange Order in 1971, in what was seen at the time as a working-class "grass roots" revolt against the till middle-class leadership of the Order. (He remained Grand Master until 1996). In the 1970s, he was a Deputy Leader of the Vanguard movement which had emerged as a faction within the Ulster Unionist Party (UUP). However, when this faction split from the UUP to form the Vanguard Unionist Progressive Party, Smyth chose to remain with the UUP. His name was linked in the Belfast Telegraph with the UUP candidacy for the Belfast North constituency in 1974. However, he did not stand there, and the following year, he was elected to the Constitutional Convention for Belfast South, polling more than double the electoral quota.

Member of Parliament 

He was selected to fill the vacancy caused by the murder of Robert Bradford. Smyth was consequently elected Member of Parliament in a 1982 by-election, receiving 17,123 votes. Later the same year, he was elected to the Northern Ireland Assembly, again polling double the electoral quota. He along with all other Unionist MPs resigned his seat in 1985 in protest at the Anglo-Irish Agreement. He successfully defended his seat in the subsequent by election. In his paper "A Federated People" (published by the Joint Unionist Working Party in 1987), Smyth proposed a federal United Kingdom with the state governments of England, Scotland, Wales and Northern Ireland each being autonomous from each other and, most significantly, fully independent from the federal parliament and government of the United Kingdom at Westminster.

Smyth was on the parliamentary advisory board of Western Goals (UK) which held a well-attended fringe meeting at the Conservative Party conference in October 1988 on the subject of "International Terrorism – how the West can fight back". He was one of numerous high-profile speakers including General Sir Walter Walker, Andrew Hunter MP, Sir Alfred Sherman and Harvey Ward. Hunter and Ward both gave considerable detail to the meeting concerning top-level links between the IRA and ANC.

Having won first place in the ballot for Private Members' Bills, Smyth successfully introduced the Disabled Persons (Northern Ireland) Bill to afford disabled people in Northern Ireland analogous rights for disabled people elsewhere in the United Kingdom as provided for in the Disabled Persons (Services, Consultation and Representation) Act 1986.  Smyth's Bill received Royal Assent in 1989.

David Trimble's leadership 

He ran for the leadership of the UUP in 1995 after James Molyneaux stood down but lost to David Trimble. He was opposed to the Good Friday Agreement, but he was considered a moderate in the early 1990s. He was condemned in 1993 by the Democratic Unionist Party for suggesting that talks with Sinn Féin might be possible. He challenged Trimble for the party leadership in 2000 and was again unsuccessful. He was unsuccessfully challenged for the UUP nomination in Belfast South by Michael McGimpsey before the 2001 general election, and went on to hold the seat. In 2001 he was elected to the position of President of the party. In 2003, he, along with David Burnside and Jeffrey Donaldson, resigned the party whip due to disagreements over the British Irish Declaration of 2003. He attempted to dissuade Donaldson from resigning from the party entirely. In January 2004, Smyth and Burnside retook the UUP whip. Later that year he lost the party Presidency in the annual election at the Ulster Unionist Council, polling 329 votes to Lord Rogan, who won with 407 votes. The same meeting saw an unsuccessful challenge to Trimble's leadership.

End of political career and 2005 general election 

In January 2005, Smyth announced he would be stepping down from Parliament at the next election to spend more time with his wife. He ended his House of Commons career in May 2005. During the election Smyth courted controversy when he and former Ulster Unionist leader James Molyneaux appeared in a photograph with Democratic Unionist Party candidate Jimmy Spratt on Spratt's election literature. Smyth denied endorsing Spratt stating:

The candidates Smyth did canvass for were David Burnside in South Antrim and Rodney McCune in North Antrim. In the event neither Unionist candidate won in South Belfast, with the seat being taken by the Social Democratic and Labour Party's Alasdair McDonnell amidst a split in the vote between the two Unionist parties.

References

External links 
 
 South Belfast election results ARK – Access Research Knowledge

1931 births
Living people
Members of the Parliament of the United Kingdom for Belfast constituencies (since 1922)
Ulster Unionist Party members of the House of Commons of the United Kingdom
Members of the Northern Ireland Constitutional Convention
Northern Ireland MPAs 1982–1986
People of The Troubles (Northern Ireland)
UK MPs 1979–1983
UK MPs 1983–1987
UK MPs 1987–1992
UK MPs 1992–1997
UK MPs 1997–2001
UK MPs 2001–2005
Alumni of Trinity College Dublin
People educated at Methodist College Belfast
Grand Masters of the Orange Order
Presbyterian ministers from Northern Ireland